Wattlebank is a rural locality in the Livingstone Shire, Queensland, Australia. In the  Wattlebank had a population of 78 people.

History 
Barmoya Central State School opened on 28 August 1918. In 1936 it was renamed Wattlebank State School. It closed in December 1959.

References 

Shire of Livingstone
Localities in Queensland